Palazzuolo sul Senio (formerly Palazzolo di Romagna; Romagnolo: Palazol) is a comune (municipality) in the Metropolitan City of Florence in the Italian region Tuscany, located about  northeast of Florence.

Palazzuolo sul Senio borders the following municipalities: Borgo San Lorenzo, Brisighella, Casola Valsenio, Castel del Rio, Firenzuola, Marradi.

References

External links 

 

Cities and towns in Tuscany